Women's Christian Temperance Union Community Building, also known as the WCTU Building, is a historic building at 160 Fayette Street in Morgantown, Monongalia County, West Virginia. It was built in 1922 by the Woman's Christian Temperance Union, and is a detached, brick, four-story plus basement structure in the Classical Revival style.  It features a smooth-cut stone cornice topped by a balustrade. The interior has a two-level basement that houses a large gymnasium.  The building also houses office space, meeting rooms, private apartments, and recreational facilities.

It was listed on the National Register of Historic Places in 1985. It is located in the Downtown Morgantown Historic District, listed in 1996.

References

Clubhouses on the National Register of Historic Places in West Virginia
Neoclassical architecture in West Virginia
Buildings and structures completed in 1922
Buildings and structures in Morgantown, West Virginia
National Register of Historic Places in Monongalia County, West Virginia
Individually listed contributing properties to historic districts on the National Register in West Virginia
Woman's Christian Temperance Union
History of women in West Virginia